Mustapha Badid (born 1964) is a paralympic track and field athlete from France competing mainly in category T53 wheelchair racing events.

Mustapha competed in four Paralympics, winning eight medals six of which were gold.  His first experience in the Paralympics was in 1984 when he competed in the 100m, 400m and shot put and won a gold medal in the A1-3 800m.  The 1988 Summer Paralympics would prove to be his best games winning gold in the 200m, 1500m, 5000m and Marathon and winning the silver in the 100m just 0.12 seconds behind Canada's Daniel Westley.  After a performance like that it was going to be difficult to match it in the 1992 but the 1992 were a complete disaster as Mustapha missed out on the medals in all his events 100m, 200m,800m and marathon.  He did get back to medal winning ways in his final games in 1996 winning a gold in the 4 × 400 m and a bronze in the 800m as well as competing in the 100m, 400m and marathon.

References

External links 
 

Living people
1964 births
Paralympic athletes of France
Athletes (track and field) at the 1984 Summer Paralympics
Athletes (track and field) at the 1988 Summer Paralympics
Athletes (track and field) at the 1992 Summer Paralympics
Athletes (track and field) at the 1996 Summer Paralympics
Paralympic gold medalists for France
Paralympic silver medalists for France
Paralympic bronze medalists for France
French male wheelchair racers
Wheelchair racers at the 1988 Summer Olympics
Paralympic wheelchair racers
Medalists at the 1984 Summer Paralympics
Medalists at the 1988 Summer Paralympics
Medalists at the 1996 Summer Paralympics
Paralympic medalists in athletics (track and field)
20th-century French people